Steve Guerdat (born 10 June 1982) is a Swiss equestrian who competes in the sport of show jumping.

He is the 2012 Olympic Champion in individual jumping. He also won the bronze medal at the 2008 Summer Olympics in team jumping following the disqualification of Norwegian rider Tony André Hansen.

In July 2012, Guerdat was ranked third in the world. In 2019 he was the first in the FEI ranking for the whole year. In January 2020 he was second in the FEI ranking, just behind the other swiss rider Martin Fuchs. He has been back at the top since February 2020.

He is a three-time World Cup champion, winning in 2015, 2016 and 2019.

Career 
Guerdat began riding at the age of seven. He was trained by his father, Philippe Guerdat, and by Beat Mändli.

Between 1997 and 2002 he was part of two junior and three young rider European championships and won two bronze medals with the team.

In 2003 he switched to the Netherlands and worked there for Jan Tops. He was selected for the jumping events at the 2004 Summer Olympics where he rode "Olympic".

In 2006 he moved to Belgium and worked for three months for billionaire Oleksandr Onishchenko.

After that Yves Piaget bought him the mare Jalisca Solier, with which he won the World Cup in Geneva.

He was selected for the 2008 Summer Olympics where he rode Jalisca Solier and won the bronze medal in team jumping following the disqualification of Norwegian rider Tony André Hansen.

In 2009 and 2011 he was named "Swiss rider of the year".

In 2012, Steve reached for the first time to top place of the world rankings. That same year he competed in London with the French Selle-Francais Nino de Buissonnets at his third Olympic Games. He was the only rider who jumped cleanly in the two final rounds of the competition and won the individual jumping gold medal. He was the first Swiss rider to win a gold medal in the jumping event since 1924 where Alphonse Gemuseus won in individual jumping.

He won back to back FEI World Cup Jumping competitions in 2015 and 2016, with the more recent competition taking place in Göteborg, Sweden.

Personal life 
Guerdat is the youngest son of Olympic show jumper Philippe Guerdat.

From April 2007 till 2017 Guerdat has lived in Herrliberg in the stables of Urs Schwarzenbach. 
Since 2017 he lives in his owns stables near Zürich in Elgg. The stables were in the past propriety of the swiss rider Paul Weier.

The French rider Fanny Skalli has announced during summer 2019 on her Instagram account the she was engaged with Steve Guerdat. On April 9 his daughter Ella was born.

Horses

Current
Albfuehren's Bianca XXXIV: 2006 Swedish Warmblood Mare (Balou du Rouet x Cardento) Owner: Steve Guerdat and Hofgut Albführen GmbH 
Venard de Cerisy: 2009 Selle Français Gelding (Open up Semilly x Rosee de Cerisy) Owner: C.H.C Horses SA 
Victorio des Frotards: 2009 Selle Français Gelding (Barbarian x Fennecy Chetardie) 
Tum Play du Jouas: 2007 Selle Français Gelding (Querlybet Hero x Fée du Jouas) 
Albfuehren's Maddox: 2011 Swedish Warmblood Stalion (Cohiba 1198 x Miami) Owner: Hofgut Albführen GmbH 
Ulysse des Forets: 2008 Selle Français Mare (Col Canto x Lavende des Forets) Owner: Steve Guerdat and La Giraffa SA 
Flair: 2010 KWPN Mare (Zirocco Blue Vdl x Brandy) Owner: Mendez Gerardo-Pasquel 
Mighty Mouse: 2006 Zangersheide Gelding
Albfuehren's Maddox: 2011 Sweden Stallion (Miami x Cohiba 1998)
Dynamix de Belheme: 2013 Selle Français Mare 
PB Maserati: 2012 Belgian Gelding (Emerald Van't Ruytershof x Cum Laude Z)
Dom Perignon: 2013 Selle Français Gelding (Quintus D'09 x Coca Z)

Former
 Olympic Z: 1996 Dutch Warmblood Gelding (Concorde x Ridder)
 Pialotta: 1991 Mare (Pilot x Akitos xx)
 Tiyl: 1996 Belgian Warmblood Gelding (Fantastique x Codex)
 Urgent III: 2001 Dutch Warmblood Gelding (Numero Uno x Julio Mariner)
Jalisca Solier: 1997-2014 Selle Français Mare (Aligator Fontaine x Dune Solier) Owner: Yves G. Piaget 
Nino des Buissonnets: 2001 Selle Français Gelding (Kannan x Hermine du Prelet (NarcosII)) Owner: Urs Schwarzenbach 
Alamo: 2008 KWPN Gelding (Ukato x Mariona) Owner: Pasquel Mendez Gerardo

Sponsors 
Rolex
Hermès
Toyota
Horseware Ireland

International championship results

References

External links
Official website

1982 births
Living people
People from Delémont District
Equestrians at the 2004 Summer Olympics
Equestrians at the 2008 Summer Olympics
Equestrians at the 2012 Summer Olympics
Equestrians at the 2016 Summer Olympics
Olympic gold medalists for Switzerland
Olympic bronze medalists for Switzerland
Olympic equestrians of Switzerland
Swiss show jumping riders
Swiss male equestrians
Olympic medalists in equestrian
Medalists at the 2012 Summer Olympics
Medalists at the 2008 Summer Olympics
Equestrians at the 2020 Summer Olympics
Sportspeople from the canton of Jura
21st-century Swiss people